Youssef Ahmed Ali (born 14 October 1988) is a Qatari international footballer who plays as a striker . Ahmed was born in Saudi Arabia. He began playing football in the streets of Jeddah, but eventually left Saudi Arabia due to the lack of possibility of obtaining citizenship. He then emigrated to Qatar and played with the youth teams of Al-Sadd before obtaining Qatari citizenship. He is known for his speed and pace, earning him the nickname "The fastest man in Asia".

Career
In 2010, Ahmed won the 2010 Qatari Stars Cup with Al-Sadd. He was the top scorer of the tournament, with 8 goals in 7 games, including the only goal in the final against Umm Salal. He was offered a contract with Belgian club Standard Liège in February 2011, after his brilliant performance in the 2011 Asian Cup, but rejected the offer.

Ahmed was sidelined with injury for most of the 2010/11 season, as a result he missed Al Sadd's historic triumph in the 2011 AFC Champions League. He returned from injury for the 2011/12 season.

International goals

Under–17

Under–23

Senior team
Scores and results list Qatar's goal tally first.

Honors

Individual
Qatari Stars Cup Top Scorer
2011

Club
Al-Sadd
Qatari League: 2006–07
Sheikh Jassem Cup: 2007
Qatari Stars Cup: 2010–11
Qatar Crown Prince Cup: 2007, 2008

External links

Yusef Ali – QSL.com.qa

References

1988 births
Living people
Qatari footballers
Naturalised citizens of Qatar
Qatar international footballers
Association football forwards
Al Sadd SC players
Al-Arabi SC (Qatar) players
Qatar SC players
Al-Shamal SC players
Umm Salal SC players
Al-Khor SC players
Al Bidda SC players
2011 AFC Asian Cup players
Qatar Stars League players
Qatari Second Division players
Qatari people of Somali descent
Asian Games medalists in football
Footballers at the 2006 Asian Games
Asian Games gold medalists for Qatar
Medalists at the 2006 Asian Games